The Selm-Bork Synagogue is one of two remaining rural synagogues in Westphalia, and a witness of pre-holocaust Jewish life in Westphalia. The exact year of construction is unknown, the first written reference was found in a directory of houses, written in 1818.

Until Kristallnacht of 1938, the synagogue was used for prayer. During the pogrom the building was looted and partially destroyed. The Jewish community was forced to sell the building. A coal dealer acquired the building and used it as a barn.

In 1991 the synagogue was restored and opened for the public in 1994, the government declared the synagogue a historic monument.

Today it is used by Etz Ami, a liberal Jewish community.

References

External links
 EtzAmi

Synagogues in North Rhine-Westphalia
Buildings and structures in Unna (district)